The 2009 Angola Basketball Super Cup (16th edition) was contested by Primeiro de Agosto, as the 2008 league champion and ASA, the 2008 cup runner-up. Primeiro de Agosto was the winner, making it its eighth title.

The 2009 Women's Super Cup (14th edition) was contested by Primeiro de Agosto, as the 2008 women's league champion and Maculusso, the 2008 cup runner-up. Primeiro de Agosto was the winner, making it its third title.

2009 Men's Super Cup

2009 Women's Super Cup

See also
 2008 Angola Basketball Cup
 2008 BAI Basket

References

Angola Basketball Super Cup seasons
Super Cup